Holy Rosary Church or Holy Rosary Catholic Church may refer to:

Asia
 Holy Rosary Church, Dhaka, Bangladesh
 Holy Rosary Church, Quetta, Pakistan
 Church of Our Lady of the Rosary (Doha), Qatar
 Holy Rosary Church, Bangkok, Thailand

Europe
 Our Lady of the Rosary Church, Saint Peter Port, Guernsey

North America

Canada
 Holy Rosary Church, Guelph
 Holy Rosary Church, Saba
 Holy Rosary Church (Toronto)

United States

 Holy Rosary Church (Bridgeport, Connecticut)
 Holy Rosary Church (Idaho Falls, Idaho), listed on the National Register of Historic Places (NRHP)
 Holy Rosary Church (Manton, Kentucky), near Springfield, Kentucky, NRHP-listed
 Holy Rosary Church (Baltimore, Maryland)
 Holy Rosary Church (Rochester, New York), NRHP-listed
 Our Lady of the Rosary Church (Detroit)
 Holy Rosary Church, Bozeman, Montana, whose Holy Rosary Church Rectory is NRHP-listed
 Holy Rosary Church (Manhattan), New York City
 Our Lady of the Holy Rosary Church (New York City)
 Holy Rosary Church (Cleveland, Ohio), NRHP-listed
 Holy Rosary Catholic Church (St. Marys, Ohio), NRHP-listed
 Holy Rosary Church (Kranzburg, South Dakota), NRHP-listed in Codington County, South Dakota
 Holy Rosary Church (Tacoma, Washington)
 Our Lady of the Holy Rosary Church, Yauco, Puerto Rico

See also 
 Holy Rosary Cathedral (disambiguation)
 Holy Rosary Parish (disambiguation)
 Holy Rosary Historic District, Kansas City, Missouri, NRHP-listed
 Holy Rosary-Danish Church Historic District, Indianapolis, Indiana, NRHP-listed